Fachtna O'Driscoll, SMA is an Irish priest with the Society of African Missions. From 2013 to 2019 he was superior general.

Early life and education
Fr. O'Driscoll, was born in Rathcormac, County Cork on 10 February 1954 to Jerome and Bridget (née O'Connor) O'Driscoll.

He went to primary school at Rathcormac National School and secondary school at St Colman's College, Fermoy, before attending St Patrick's College, Maynooth where he studied for a BA and later a Bachelor of Divinity.

A keen sportsman, he played hurling for Bride Rovers GAA, and represented Maynooth, winning medals in the Fitzgibbon Cup for hurling in 1973 and 1974 and the Devine Cup for soccer.

Career
Fachtna O'Driscoll became a permanent member of the Society of African Missions in 1978 and was ordained as a priest in 1979. His first assignment was to Ekiti Diocese Nigeria where he lived until 1986 and learned Yoruba. After completing a masters in counselling at Boston College Massachusetts, he was named rector of the SMA house in Maynooth and was elected to the Irish Provincial Council of SMA in 1995. In 2001 he became Irish Provincial Superior of the SMA, and was re-elected to this position in 2006. From 2013 to 2019 he was Superior General of the Society of African Missions worldwide.

His older brother Gus is also a member of the SMA serving in the Philippines.

References

20th-century Irish Roman Catholic priests
Christian clergy from County Cork
Alumni of St Patrick's College, Maynooth
1952 births
Living people
People educated at St Colman's College, Fermoy
21st-century Irish Roman Catholic priests

Society of African Missions